Gaelle Josse (born 1960) is a French poet and novelist. She has written four novels till date. She has won a number of literary prizes and her work has been translated into several languages.

Works

 Les heures silencieuses (The Quiet Hours, 2011) 
 Nos vies désaccordées (Our Out of Tune Lives, 2012) - 2013 Prix Alain-Fournier
 Noces de neige (Snow Wedding, 2013)
 Le dernier gardien d’Ellis Island (The Last Guardian of Ellis Island) - Grand Livre du Mois Literary Prize, EU Prize for Literature
 L'Ombre de nos nuits (The shadow of our nights, 2016)
Un été à quatre mains (A summer for four hands, 2017)
 Une longue impatience (A long impatience, 2018)
 Une femme en contre-jour (A woman against the light, 2019)

Formerly a resident of New Caledonia, Josse now lives in Paris.

Decorations 
 Chevalier of the Order of Arts and Letters (2016)

References

1960 births
Living people
21st-century French novelists
French women novelists
21st-century French women writers
Chevaliers of the Ordre des Arts et des Lettres
Prix Alain-Fournier winners